Malika is the Arabic word for 'queen' and the feminine form of the name Malik.

Given name 
Judith Malika Liberman (born 1978), French storyteller, writer and teacher
Malika or al-Nadirah, princess of Hatra per Perso-Arabic traditions
Malika al-Fassi (1919–2007), Moroccan writer
Malika Amar Sheikh (born 1957), Marathi Indian writer
Malika Andrews (born 1995), American sports journalist
 Malika Askari, Indian actress, sister of actress Mumtaz
Malika Auger-Aliassime (born 1998), Canadian junior tennis player
Malika Ayane (born 1984), Italian singer
Malika Benarab-Attou (born 1963), French politician
Malika El Aroud (born 1960), Moroccan internet Islamist living in Belgium
Malika Kalontarova (born 1950), Tajik American dancer
Malika Louback, Djiboutian-French fashion model and engineer
Malika Ménard (born 1987), Miss France 2010
Malika Mokeddem (born 1949), Algerian writer
Malika Oufkir (born 1953), Moroccan writer
Malika Pukhraj (1912–2004), Pakistani singer
Malika Tahir, French figure skater
Malika-e-Tarranum, honorific of Noor Jehan (1926–2000), singer from British India and later Pakistan
Malika Tirolien (born 1983), Guadeloupean-born singer-songwriter living in Montréal
Malika Zarra, Moroccan singer
Princess Lalla Malika of Morocco (born 1933), Moroccan princess

See also
Mallika, given name

References

Arabic feminine given names